The Nufloors Penticton Curling Classic is an annual bonspiel on the men's tour. It is held annually in November at the Penticton Curling Club in Penticton, British Columbia. It has been held since 2017. From 2017–2020, the event was sponsored by Ashley HomeStore, a U.S. based furniture retailer. Starting in 2021, the tournament will be sponsored by Nufloors Penticton, a Canadian flooring service.

With a purse of $100,000, it has one of the highest purses on the tour and attracts some of the top curling teams in the world.

Previous names
 2017–2020: Ashley HomeStore Curling Classic
 2021–present: Nufloors Penticton Curling Classic

Past champions

References

Curling in British Columbia
Sport in Penticton